András Rédli (born 21 October 1983) is a Hungarian right-handed épée fencer, 2010 team European champion, 2014 individual European champion, 2013 team world champion, and 2016 Olympic medalist.

Career
Rédli won the team gold medal in the 2013 World Championships at home in Budapest and the team gold in the 2009 European Championships in Plovdiv. He won the gold medal in the 2014 European Fencing Championships.

Rédli was educated at Óbuda University. He belongs to the Hungarian Defence Force.

Medal Record

Olympic Games

World Championship

European Championship

Grand Prix

World Cup

Awards 
Junior Príma award (2009)
Member of Hungarian fencing team of the Year (2): 2008, 2009
Hungarian Fencer of the Year (1): 2014

Orders and special awards
  Badge of Honour – Silver Cross (2014)
  Cross of Merit of Hungary – Golden Cross (2016)

References

External links

 
 
 
 
 
 Andras Redli at Fencingworldwide.com
 

1983 births
Living people
Hungarian male épée fencers
People from Tapolca
Olympic bronze medalists for Hungary
Olympic medalists in fencing
Olympic fencers of Hungary
Fencers at the 2016 Summer Olympics
Medalists at the 2016 Summer Olympics
World Fencing Championships medalists
Universiade medalists in fencing
Universiade gold medalists for Hungary
Medalists at the 2007 Summer Universiade
Sportspeople from Veszprém County